KSFA (860 AM) is a terrestrial American conservative news and talk radio station licensed to Nacogdoches, Texas, and serving the Lufkin/Nacogdoches area. The facility is under ownership of Townsquare Media.

Notable weekday programming includes shows hosted by Brad Maule, Spence Peppard, Glenn Beck, Sean Hannity, and Mark Levin, plus Coast to Coast AM.

Translator

References

External links
KSFA NewsTalk 860 AM - Official Site

SFA
News and talk radio stations in the United States
Radio stations established in 1947
1947 establishments in Texas
Townsquare Media radio stations